Ronald F. Chismar (October 23, 1934 – December 26, 1998) was an American football coach.  He served as the head football coach at Wichita State University from 1984 to 1986, compiling a record of 8–25.

Chismar graduated from Kent State University in 1961 with a Bachelor of Science in education and earned a Master of Science degree from the University of Akron in 1969.  During the 1960s, he coached high school football in Ohio.  Chismar began his college football coaching career at Bowling Green State University in 1970 as an assistant on Don Nehlen's staff.  He remained at Bowling Green through the 1973 season before moving to Michigan State University in 1974 to coach the offensive line under Denny Stolz and then Darryl Rogers.  When Rogers's became the head coach at Arizona State University in 1980, Chismar moved with him to serve as offensive coordinator.  Chismar helped lead the Arizona State Sun Devils to the 1983 Fiesta Bowl, where they defeated the Oklahoma and finished the season ranked No. 6 in both major polls.

Following Wichita State discontinuing its football program after the conclusion of the 1986 season, Chismar returned to assistant coaching at Rice University. He also coached at Temple University, then moved to Fort Scott Community College in Fort Scott, Kansas, to serve as head football coach and athletic director.  Chismar died on December 26, 1998, in Phoenix, Arizona.

Head coaching record

College

References

1934 births
1998 deaths
Arizona State Sun Devils football coaches
Bowling Green Falcons football coaches
Fort Scott Greyhounds football coaches
Michigan State Spartans football coaches
Rice Owls football coaches
Temple Owls football coaches
Wichita State Shockers football coaches
High school football coaches in Ohio
Kent State University alumni
University of Akron alumni